Solute carrier family 7, member 14 is a protein that in humans is encoded by the SLC7A14 gene.

This gene is predicted to encode a glycosylated, cationic amino acid transporter protein with 14 transmembrane domains. This gene is primarily expressed in skin fibroblasts, neural tissuee, photoreceptor cells, hair cells and primary endothelial cells and its protein is predicted to mediate lysosomal uptake of cationic amino acids. In mice, this gene is expressed in the photoreceptor layer of the retina where its expression increases over the course of retinal development and persists in the mature retina.  The gene is also highly expressed in all vertebrate hair cells. In the mammalian inner ear, this gene is expressed in neonatal inner and outer hair cells during development and becomes specifically expressed in inner hair cells in adult animals , .Mutations in this gene are associated with autosomal recessive retinitis pigmentosa and hearing loss in the form of auditory neuropathy.

References

Further reading 

 
 
 

Genes on human chromosome 3
Solute carrier family